Mountaineer Baseball Field is a baseball venue located in Kerrville, Texas and home to the Schreiner Mountaineers of the American Southwest Conference.

References

Baseball venues in Texas